HMS Grafton was a first class cruiser of the , launched in 1892. She served in colonial service and in the First World War. Grafton survived the war and was broken up in the 1920s.

Construction
Grafton was laid down at the Thames Ironworks and Shipbuilding Company's London shipyard on 1 January 1890, and launched on 30 January 1892.

Service

Commissioned at Portsmouth on 10 September 1895, she served in the China sea on the China station from 22 April 1896 until 10 September 1899.

In December 1901 she was ordered to relieve  as flagship on the Pacific Station. She was commissioned at Chatham by Captain John Locke Marx on 14 January 1902, with a complement of 571 officers and men. Leaving Plymouth on 31 January 1902, she stopped at Madeira, São Vicente, Montevideo and Sandy Point before arriving at the garrison of the Pacific station in Valparaíso in mid-March. Rear-Admiral Andrew Bickford hoisted his flag as Commander-in-Chief, Pacific Station, on Grafton a couple of days later. Captain Colin Richard Keppel transferred as flag captain from Warspite to Grafton on the same day, changing places with Marx.

Shortly thereafter, on 18 April 1902, Grafton landed two parties of fully armed sailors at San José, Guatemala, to suppress the revolutionary disturbance caused by the United Kingdom's efforts to obtain re-payment of a loan from the Guatemalan government. The show of force sufficed, and the government paid. In December that year she visited Monterey, San Diego, Mazatlán and Acapulco.

On the outbreak of the First World War, Grafton was part of the 10th Cruiser Squadron, which was employed in enforcing the naval blockade of Germany. It was decided to refit four ships of the Edgar class, including Grafton, for shore bombardment work for the planned operations in the Dardanelles. Two 6 inch guns replaced the 9.2 inch weapons that had been removed to arm the M15-class ships, while anti-torpedo bulges were fitted.

Grafton carried out shore bombardment during the landing at Suvla Bay and the Battle of Sari Bair in August 1915. She was struck by Turkish shells off Suvla on 12 August, killing nine of her crew. Grafton helped to cover the evacuations from Anzac Cove on 20 December 1915 and from Cape Helles in January 1916. Grafton was later awarded the battle honour "DARDANELLES, Feb 1915- Jan 1916" for her service off Gallipoli.

Graftons anti-torpedo bulges proved effective and damage was limited, allowing her to be safely brought into port at Malta under her own power with no casualties. She later took part in the Battle of Jaffa.

Grafton was sold for breaking up at Plymouth on 1 July 1920.

Notes

Sources

External links
 

 

Edgar-class cruisers
Ships built in Leamouth
Victorian-era cruisers of the United Kingdom
World War I cruisers of the United Kingdom
1892 ships